This is a list of notable primary and secondary schools located in the African country of Sudan.

Khartoum State

Garden City 
 École Française Internationale de Khartoum

Omdurman 
 Omdurman Ahlia High School

Khartoum 
 Gordon Memorial College – defunct  primary and secondary school; in 1951, tertiary school merged into * 
 Kitchener School of Medicine 
 Khartoum American School 
 Khartoum International Community School 
 Unity High School

Tertiary schools

See also 

 Education in Sudan

Schools
Schools
Sudan
Sudan
Schools